Fulkerson is an unincorporated community in Johnson County, in the U.S. state of Missouri.

History
A post office called Fulkerson was established in 1882, and remained in operation until 1904. The community was named after Reuben Fulkerson, an early settler.

References

Unincorporated communities in Johnson County, Missouri
Unincorporated communities in Missouri